Allen Jack+Cottier (AJ+C) is an urban design, architecture and interior design practice. Principals Michael Heenan and Peter Ireland head up the Sydney architectural practice of over 80 staff, in their Chippendale studio.

John Allen began the firm in 1952 and in 1956 formed a partnership with, university friend Russell Jack. The firm, initially called John Allen and Russell C Jack was renamed Allen Jack+Cottier in 1964 when Keith Cottier became a partner. In 2001, Cottier was awarded the Australian Institute of Architects' highest honour, the Gold Medal.

Founding Partners

Allen
John Allen's father encouraged him to become a solicitor and he was accepted into University of Sydney’s Law School in 1945.  A year later Allen's interest in art and design prompted him to instead enrol in Architecture at Sydney Technical College. To gain practical experience during his six-year course Allen worked for Fowell & Mansfield until late 1948 and then for Rudder, Littlemore & Rudder. An economic downturn in 1951-1952 saw Allen redundant and lead to him to become a sole practitioner by July 1952. Initially Allen limited his work to small-scale additions and alterations for friends and family. His first significant entirely new project was a house completed in Vancouver Street, Red Hill, Australian Capital Territory.

Jack
Russel Callum Jack was a contemporary of Allen's at Sydney Technical College and with him at Rudder, Littlemore & Rudder whilst completing his studies. Jack aspired to be an architect from a young age and during his years in the Royal Australian Air Force he studied building construction and freehand drawing by correspondence. Jack won many prizes after graduation including the prestigious Byera Hadley Travelling Scholarship. In May 1952 Jack set off with fellow architects to London where he worked for Tripe & Wakeham Architecture Firm for a few months, his work there included a harem for the Sheik of Kuwait. During his time in Europe he travelled through the Netherlands, Belgium, Germany, Switzerland, France, Italy, Denmark, Norway and Sweden. This experience developed and broadened Jack's understanding of townscapes and urban spaces. Upon Jacks return to Australia he gained more professional experience at Rudder, Littlemore & Rudder for two years.

Jack's first major award was in 1958 with the RAIA Sir John Sulman Medal for his own house in Wahroonga, Sydney.

Cottier
In July 1956 John Allen and Russel Jack formed an equal partnership. For the first few years their clientele was relatively small limited to Allen focusing on some factory designs and Jack designing a few houses. Allen's pre-fabricated steel design for Wolfe Electric Tools Factory 1957, at Homebush was the basis for future industrial structures, notably Qantas and Keith Cottier's Domaine Chandon. Cottier, born in 1938,  joined the firm in 1957, Allen and Jack recognised Cottier's prominent architectural talent after seeing his designs for Clubbe Hall and shortly after Cottier was made partner. In 1964 the firm was renamed Allen Jack+Cottier.

In 2001 Cottier was awarded the Royal Australian Institute of Architects Gold Medal. Cottier was appointed a Member of the Order of Australia in 2004 for service to architecture as a member of a range of planning, heritage protection and property management organisations, and as a practising architect. He is a trustee of Historic Houses Trust and a member of Sydney Opera House Eminent Architects Panel.

Award Winning Projects

Allen Jack+Cottier has designed some major architectural projects:

See also

Architecture of Australia

References

Architecture firms of Australia
Cottier, Keith
1952 establishments in Australia